Caledonia is the name of some places in the U.S. state of Wisconsin:

Caledonia, Wisconsin, a village in Racine County
Caledonia, Columbia County, Wisconsin, a town in Columbia County
Caledonia, Trempealeau County, Wisconsin, a town in Trempealeau County
Caledonia, Waupaca County, Wisconsin, a town in Waupaca County